Marko Banović (born 24 April 1967) is a Croatian rower. He competed at the 1992 Summer Olympics and the 1996 Summer Olympics.

References

External links
 

1967 births
Living people
Croatian male rowers
Olympic rowers of Croatia
Rowers at the 1992 Summer Olympics
Rowers at the 1996 Summer Olympics
Sportspeople from Zagreb